The 1985 Western Athletic Conference men's basketball tournament was held March 4–7 at the Special Events Center in El Paso, Texas.

In their first season in the WAC, San Diego State defeated defending champions UTEP in the championship game, 87–81, to clinch their first WAC men's tournament championship.

The Aztecs, in turn, received an automatic bid to the 1985 NCAA tournament while top-seeded UTEP additionally received an at-large bid.

Format
The tournament expanded by one team with the addition of San Diego State from the PCAA. 

The top two teams from the regular season standings continued to receive a double-bye while the third-seeded team got a single-bye. The remaining six teams, in turn, competed in the first round. Seeding was based on regular season conference records.

Bracket

References

WAC men's basketball tournament
Tournament
WAC men's basketball tournament
WAC men's basketball tournament
Basketball competitions in El Paso, Texas
College basketball tournaments in Texas